Curdella Forbes is a Jamaican academic and critically acclaimed author.

Life and career
Forbes has worked as the professor of Caribbean literature at Howard University since 2004 after working at the University of the West Indies, Mona, which was where she also got her doctorate in 2000. She has also been writer in residence at University of the West Indies, Mona.

Selected works

Novels
 A Tall History of Sugar (2019)
 Ghosts (2014)
 A Permanent Freedom (2008)
 Flying with Icarus (2003)
 Songs Of Silence (2002)

Non-fiction
 Through the lens of gender : a revisionary reading of the novels of Samuel Selvon and George Lamming (2000)
 Shakespeare, other Shakespeares and West Indian popular culture : a reading of the erotics of errantry and rebellion in 'Troilus and Cressida (2001)
 Fracturing subjectivities : international space and the discourse of individualism in Colin Channer's 'Waiting in vain' and Jamaica Kincaid's 'Mr. Potter (2008)
 Between plot and plantation, trespass and transgression : Caribbean migratory disobedience in fiction and Internet traffic (2012)
 The end of nationalism? : performing the question in Benítez-Rojo's 'The repeating island' and Glissant's 'Poetics of relation'  (2002)
 "Trespassers will be persecuted" : reading migratory subjectivities in Maryse Condé's 'Heremakhonon' and perambulatory chain emails  (2010)
 Selling that Caribbean woman down the river : diasporic travel narratives and the global economy (2005)
 Tropes of the carnivalesque : hermaphroditic gender as identity in slave society and in West Indian fictions (1999)
 Revisiting Samuel Selvon's trilogy of exile : implications for gender consciousness and gender relations in Caribbean culture  (1997)

References

Further reading

Living people
21st-century Jamaican novelists
21st-century Jamaican women writers
Year of birth missing (living people)
University of the West Indies academics
Howard University faculty
University of the West Indies alumni
Jamaican non-fiction writers
Jamaican women novelists
Women non-fiction writers
21st-century non-fiction writers
20th-century Jamaican writers
20th-century Jamaican women writers
20th-century non-fiction writers